The 35th People's Choice Awards, honoring the best in popular culture for 2008, was held on January 7, 2009 at the Shrine Auditorium in Los Angeles, California. They were hosted by Queen Latifah in her third straight year as host, and was broadcast on CBS. Performers for the show included Carrie Underwood and Rascal Flatts.

Due to the 35th anniversary of the People's Choice Awards and People Magazine, the two combined forces to create an award entitled "Favorite Star Under 35". The award was made for that one show and that show only. Multi-platinum singer, American Idol winner, and 5-time Grammy Award winner Carrie Underwood received the award based on the public's choice from an online poll.

Nominations and winners
The nominees for the awards were selected with the help of E-Poll Market Research using what it describes as the People's Choice Online Community to achieve a nationally representative sample of respondents aged 13 or older. For each category, the respondents were provided with a set of candidates determined by national ratings averages, box-office grosses and music sales. The respondents then chose their favorites in Television, Movies and Music. They also had the option to write in their favorites where not included among the provided candidates. The top three selections in each category became the final nominees. Winners were chosen online by those who registered with the awards shows official website.

Awards
Winners are listed first in bold. Other nominees are in alphabetical order.

Favorite Star Under 35

This special category was added into the 35th Annual Award show only, because both the People's Choice and People Magazine were both celebrating their 35th anniversary. This was a one-time award, so the current title-holder (Carrie Underwood) will be the only title-holder.

Amy Adams
Drew Barrymore
Beyoncé
Orlando Bloom
Chris Brown
Chace Crawford
Miley Cyrus
Leonardo DiCaprio
Zac Efron
America Ferrera
Ryan Gosling
Jake Gyllenhaal
Anne Hathaway
Scarlett Johansson
Angelina Jolie
Alicia Keys
Keira Knightley
John Krasinski
Shia LaBeouf
Blake Lively
John Mayer
Eva Mendes
Daniel Radcliffe
Rihanna
Jordin Sparks
Taylor Swift
Justin Timberlake
Carrie Underwood
Usher
Milo Ventimiglia
Pete Wentz
Kanye West
Reese Witherspoon

References

People's Choice Awards
2008 awards
2009 awards in the United States
2009 in California